C or Do is the first note and semitone of the C major scale, the third note of the A minor scale (the relative minor of C major), and the fourth note (G, A, B, C) of the Guidonian hand, commonly pitched around 261.63 Hz. The actual frequency has depended on historical pitch standards, and for transposing instruments a distinction is made between written and sounding or concert pitch. It has enharmonic equivalents of B and D.

In English the term Do is used interchangeably with C only by adherents of fixed Do solfège; in the movable Do system Do refers to the tonic of the prevailing key.

Frequency
Historically, concert pitch has varied. For an instrument in equal temperament tuned to the A440 pitch standard widely adopted in 1939, middle C has a frequency around 261.63 Hz (for other notes see piano key frequencies). Scientific pitch was originally proposed in 1713 by French physicist Joseph Sauveur and based on the numerically convenient frequency of 256 Hz for middle C, all C's being powers of two. After the A440 pitch standard was adopted by musicians, the Acoustical Society of America published new frequency tables for scientific use. A movement to restore the older A435 standard has used the banners "Verdi tuning", "philosophical pitch" or the easily confused scientific pitch.

Octave nomenclature

Middle C

Middle C (the fourth C key from left on a standard 88-key piano keyboard) is designated C4 in scientific pitch notation, and c′ in Helmholtz pitch notation; it is note number 60 in MIDI notation.

While the expression Middle C is generally clear across instruments and clefs, some musicians naturally use the term to refer to the C note in the middle of their specific instrument's range. C4 may be called Low C by someone playing a Western concert flute, which has a higher and narrower playing range than the piano, while C5 (523.251 Hz) would be Middle C. This technically inaccurate practice has led some pedagogues to encourage standardizing on C4 as the definitive Middle C in instructional materials across all instruments.

On the Grand Staff, Middle C is notated with a ledger line above the top line of the bass staff or below the bottom line of the treble staff. Alternatively, it is written on the centre line of a staff using the alto clef, or on the fourth line from the bottom, or the second line from the top, of staves using the tenor clef.

Other octaves
In vocal music, the term High C (sometimes called Top C) can refer to either the soprano's C6 (1046.502 Hz; c′′′ in Helmholtz notation) or the tenor's C5; both are written as the C two ledger lines above the treble clef but the tenor voice sings an octave lower. 

Tenor C is an organ builder's term for small C or C3 (130.813 Hz), the note one octave below Middle C. In older stoplists it usually means that a rank was not yet full compass, omitting the bottom octave, until that octave was added later on.

Designation by octave

For a classical piano and musical theory, the middle C is usually labelled as C4; However, in the MIDI standard definition (like the one used in Apple's GarageBand), this middle C (261.626 Hz) is labelled C3. In practice, a MIDI software can label middle C (261.626 Hz) as C3–C5, which can cause confusion, especially for beginners. The frequencies given in this table are based on the standard that A=440Hz and with equal temperament

Graphic presentation

Scales

Common scales beginning on C
 C major: C D E F G A B C
 C natural minor: C D E F G A B C
 C harmonic minor: C D E F G A B C
 C melodic minor ascending: C D E F G A B C
 C melodic minor descending: C B A G F E D C

Diatonic scales
 C Ionian: C D E F G A B C
 C Dorian: C D E F G A B C
 C Phrygian: C D E F G A B C
 C Lydian: C D E F G A B C
 C Mixolydian: C D E F G A B C
 C Aeolian: C D E F G A B C
 C Locrian: C D E F G A B C

Jazz melodic minor
 C ascending melodic minor: C D E F G A B C
 C Dorian ♭2: C D E F G A B C
 C Lydian augmented: C D E F G A B C
 C Lydian dominant: C D E F G A B C
 C Mixolydian ♭6: C D E F G A B C
 C Locrian ♮2: C D E F G A B C
 C altered: C D E F G A B C

See also
 Piano key frequencies
 A440 (pitch standard)
 C major
 C minor
 Root (chord)

References

Musical notes